Threlkeldia diffusa, also known as coast bonefruit, is a perennial herb which occurs in coastal areas and saline flats in Australia. It is sometimes prostrate or may grow up to 0.4 metres in height. The green flowers occur between October and November (spring) in its native range.

References
 

Amaranthaceae
Caryophyllales of Australia
Flora of South Australia
Flora of Victoria (Australia)
Eudicots of Western Australia